Kevin Powers (born July 11, 1980) is an American fiction writer, poet, and Iraq War veteran.

Biography
Powers was born and raised in Richmond, Virginia, the son of a factory worker and a postman, and enlisted in the U.S. Army at the age of seventeen. He attended James River High School. Six years later, in 2004, he served a one-year tour in Iraq as a machine gunner assigned to an engineer unit. Powers served in Mosul and Tal Afar, Iraq, from February 2004 to March 2005. After his honorable discharge, Powers enrolled in Virginia Commonwealth University, where he graduated in 2008 with a bachelor's degree in English. He holds an MFA from the University of Texas at Austin, where he was a Michener Fellow in Poetry.

The Yellow Birds
Powers's first novel The Yellow Birds, which drew on his experiences in the Iraq War, garnered a lucrative advance from publisher Michael Pietsch at Little, Brown. It has been called 'a classic of contemporary war fiction' by the New York Times. Michiko Kakutani, book critic for The New York Times, subsequently named the novel one of her 10 favorite books of 2012. Wrote Kakutani: "At once a freshly imagined bildungsroman and a metaphysical parable about the loss of innocence and the uses of memory, it's a novel that will stand with Tim O'Brien's enduring Vietnam book, The Things They Carried, as a classic of contemporary war fiction."

In an interview, Powers explained to The Guardian newspaper why he wrote the book: "One of the reasons that I wrote this book was the idea that people kept saying: 'What was it like over there?' It seemed that it was not an information-based problem. There was lots of information around. But what people really wanted was to know what it felt like; physically, emotionally and psychologically. So that's why I wrote it."

Asked about the best book of 2012, writer Dave Eggers said this to The Observer: "There are a bunch of books I could mention, but the book I find myself pushing on people more than any other is The Yellow Birds by Kevin Powers. The author fought in Iraq with the US army, and then, many years later, this gorgeous novel emerged. Next to The Forever War by Dexter Filkins, it's the best thing I've read about the war in Iraq, and by far the best novel. Powers is a poet first, so the book is spare, incredibly precise, unimproveable. And it's easily the saddest book I've read in many years. But sad in an important way."

Not all critics were so laudatory of The Yellow Birds, however. Ron Charles of The Washington Post wrote that "frankly, the parts of The Yellow Birds are better than the whole. Some chapters lack sufficient power, others labor under the influence of classic war stories, rather than arising organically from the author's unique vision." Michael Larson of Salon argues that the book is ruined by "boggy lyricism... There's never a sky not worthy of a few adjectives." And Theo Tait of the London Review of Books argued that the book "labours under the weight of a massive Hemingway crush... a trainwreck, from the first inept and imprecise simile, to the tin-eared rhythms, to the final incoherent thought." 

The book has been adapted on screen in 2017, The Yellow Birds was directed by Alexandre Moors and starred Jack Huston, Alden Ehrenreich, Tye Sheridan and Jennifer Aniston.

Awards and honors
2012, Guardian First Book Award, winner, The Yellow Birds
2012, National Book Award (Fiction), finalist, The Yellow Birds
2012, Flaherty-Dunnan First Novel Prize Short List, The Yellow Birds
2013, Hemingway Foundation/PEN Award, winner, The Yellow Birds
2013, Anisfield-Wolf Book Award, co-winner, fiction "The Yellow Birds"

Works
The Yellow Birds: a novel, New York: Little, Brown 2012. , 
Letters Composed During a Lull in the Fighting: Poems, New York: Little, Brown and Company, 2014.
A Shout in the Ruins: a novel, New York: Little, Brown and Company, 2018. ,

References

External links
 Author's website 

Living people
21st-century American novelists
American male novelists
Hemingway Foundation/PEN Award winners
Military personnel from Richmond, Virginia
Writers from Richmond, Virginia
1980 births
21st-century American male writers
Novelists from Virginia
Michener Center for Writers alumni
Virginia Commonwealth University alumni